North Jakarta Intercultural School (NJIS), formerly North Jakarta International School, is a private international school in Kelapa Gading, Jakarta, Indonesia. The school is an Internation Baccalaureate Continuum international school with an American orientation.

History 
NJIS was established in January 1990 and licensed by the Indonesian Ministry of Education to provide schooling for the children of expatriates and local residents residing in Jakarta. It is established as a Yayasan (not-for-profit social foundation) and operates as an independent, not-for-profit, co-educational day school for students in Pre-Kindergarten through Grade 12. NJIS is a member of the East Asia Regional Council of Schools (EARCOS). In 2020, North Jakarta Intercultural School was registered for the first time as an International Baccalaureate Continuum School, being accredited for Primary Years Programme, Middle Years Programme and the Diploma Programme. The school is also accredited by the Accrediting Commission for Schools of the Western Association of Schools and Colleges (WASC). High School Students have an option to earn AP college credit from the American CollegeBoard. The student body is made up of 164 students from 16 nationalities from Pre-k to Grade 12.

Curriculum 
NJIS offers an IB with a U.S. orientation. It offers a College Placement program based on American Common Core Curriculum leading to Advanced Placement courses and diploma.

The language of instruction is English, and Mandarin and Indonesian are offered as additional languages. NJIS faculty members are a combination of overseas hired and locally hired,  with the majority being U.S. citizens. All teachers who have at least a bachelor's degree and have a minimum of five years’ teaching experience. All teachers are certified by recognized and accredited universities. Most faculty members have a master's degree.

Campus 
In 2012 the school relocated to a 20.000 m2 new building on Jl.Boulevard Bukit Gading Raya, Kelapa Gading Jakarta Utara, Indonesia. Toll roads from west and south Jakarta are close to NJIS.

References

External links

Official website

International schools in Jakarta
Educational institutions established in 1990
1990 establishments in Indonesia
North Jakarta